Alexandru Mateiu (born 10 December 1989) is a Romanian professional footballer who plays for Liga I team CS Universitatea Craiova as a midfielder.

He spent his youth years and the first part of his senior career with hometown club FC Brașov, before signing for Universitatea Craiova in 2014. With the latter, he has since amassed over 170 matches in the Romanian first division.

Mateiu recorded his first and only appearance for the Romania national team in May 2014.

Club career
Mateiu started his senior career in 2007, when he joined the first team of Brașov, which played in the Liga II. From the second half of the 2011–12 season, he established himself as a regular for "the Yellow-Blacks".

In 2014, Mateiu left his hometown club to join newly promoted CS Universitatea Craiova.

International career
Mateiu made his debut for the Romania national team in a friendly game against Albania in Switzerland, in May 2014.

Career statistics

International

Honours

FC Brașov
Liga II: 2007–08

Universitatea Craiova
Cupa României: 2017–18, 2020–21
Supercupa României: 2021

References

External links

1989 births
Living people
Sportspeople from Brașov
Romanian footballers
Association football midfielders
Liga I players
Liga II players
FC Brașov (1936) players
CS Universitatea Craiova players
Romania international footballers